The Original of the Forgery is a 1991 Yugoslav drama film directed by Dragan Kresoja. The film was selected as the Yugoslav entry for the Best Foreign Language Film at the 64th Academy Awards, but was not accepted as a nominee.

Cast
 Lazar Ristovski as Pavle
 Dragan Nikolic as Pavlovic
 Velimir 'Bata' Zivojinovic as Vujic (as Bata Zivojinovic)
 Snezana Bogdanovic as Lena
 Zarko Lausevic as Stojan
 Dusan Jakisic as Dragisa
 Ruzica Sokic as Mileva
 Nebojsa Bakocevic as Pavle Pavlovic

See also
 List of submissions to the 64th Academy Awards for Best Foreign Language Film
 List of Yugoslav submissions for the Academy Award for Best Foreign Language Film

References

External links
 

1991 films
1991 drama films
Yugoslav drama films
Serbian drama films
1990s Serbian-language films
Films set in Belgrade